James I. Mullins is an American scientist. Jim currently is a Professor of Microbiology and Medicine at the University of Washington in Seattle, Washington.

References

Living people
University of Washington faculty
Year of birth missing (living people)
Place of birth missing (living people)
American scientists